ILY:1 (/aɪliːhwnj/; Korean: 아일리원; RR: Ailliwon) is a South Korean girl group formed by FC ENM. The group consists of six members: Hana, Ara, Rona, Ririka, Nayu and Elva. They made their debut on April 4, 2022 with their single album Love in Bloom.

Name
The group name 'ILY:1' is a combination of 'I' as in oneself and '-ly' meaning 'I like myself'. The '1' represents the individual members with their unique characteristics to full a whole group.  ILY is also an acronym for "I love you".

History

Pre-debut
In 2018, Rona was a trainee of TPE48 (currently known as AKB48 Team TP).

In 2020, Ririka was a contestant on the Japanese reality survival show Nizi Project, but was eliminated.

Hana and Ririka were members of the Japanese-Korean  project girl group Orange Latte, the group was active for a period of time and disbanded in 2021. In the same year, Hana, Rona, Ririka and Ara were contestants on the reality survival show Girls Planet 999 but did not make it into the final debut lineup.

2022–present: Debut with Love in Bloom, Que Sera Sera and Twinkle, Twinkle
On January 5, 2022, ILY:1 was confirmed to make their official debut in March 2022. ILY:1 was originally scheduled to debut on March 15, 2022, releasing their first single album Love in Bloom, as well as hold their first fan showcase on the same day and release pre-release single "Azalea" on March 11, 2022.  However, on March 11, FC ENM announced the postponement of the debut on April 4 due to the aftermath of COVID-19. 

On April 4, 2022, ILY:1 officially debuted with the debut single album Love in Bloom led by the title of the same name.

On July 19, 2022, ILY:1 released their second single album Que Sera Sera led by the title of the same name.

On January 5, 2023, ILY:1 released their first extended play A Dream Of ILY:1 led by the title track "Twinkle, Twinkle".

Members
Adapted from their Naver profile.
 Nayu (나유) – leader
 Hana (하나)
 Ara (아라)
 Rona (로나)
 Ririka (리리카)
 Elva  (엘바)

Discography

Extended plays

Single albums

Singles

Videography

Music videos

Filmography

Web shows

Awards and nominations

References

K-pop music groups
Musical groups established in 2022
South Korean girl groups
South Korean dance music groups
South Korean pop music groups
Musical groups from Seoul
2022 establishments in South Korea